Minister for Small Business may refer to:

 Minister for Small Business (Australia)
 Minister for Small Business (United Kingdom)
 Minister for Small Business (Western Australia)